The 2002 Pittsburgh Pirates season was the 121st season of the franchise; the 116th in the National League. This was their second season at PNC Park. The Pirates finished fourth in the National League Central with a record of 72–89.

The Pirates missed the playoffs for the tenth straight season, tying a record set between 1980 and 1989.

Offseason
January 5, 2002: Scott Service was signed as a free agent with the Pittsburgh Pirates.
January 25, 2002: Wayne Gomes was signed as a free agent with the Pittsburgh Pirates.
March 5, 2002: Curtis Pride was signed as a free agent with the Pittsburgh Pirates.
March 5, 2002: Josías Manzanillo was signed as a free agent with the Pittsburgh Pirates.

Regular season

Season standings

Game log

|- style="background:#fbb;"
| 1 || April 1 || @ Mets || 2–6 || Leiter (1–0) || Villone (0–1) || — || 53,734 || 0–1
|- style="background:#cfc;"
| 2 || April 3 || @ Mets || 5–3 || Wells (1–0) || Trachsel (0–1) || Williams (1) || 25,952 || 1–1
|- style="background:#cfc;"
| 3 || April 4 || @ Mets || 3–2 || Anderson (1–0) || Estes (0–1) || Williams (2) || 33,785 || 2–1
|- style="background:#cfc;"
| 4 || April 5 || @ Cubs || 2–1 || Williams (1–0) || Bere (0–1) || Williams (3) || 41,555 || 3–1
|- style="background:#cfc;"
| 5 || April 6 || @ Cubs || 6–1 || Fogg (1–0) || Clement (0–1) || — || 34,956 || 4–1
|- style="background:#bbb;"
| — || April 7 ||colspan=7| Postponed
|- style="background:#cfc;"
| 6 || April 8 || Reds || 1–0 || Villone (1–1) || Dessens (0–2) || Williams (4) || 36,402 || 5–1
|- style="background:#fbb;"
| 7 || April 10 || Reds || 5–8 || Acevedo (2–0) || Wells (1–1) || Graves (2) || 36,048 || 5–2
|- style="background:#fbb;"
| 8 || April 11 || Reds || 2–3 || Haynes (1–1) || Anderson (1–1) || Graves (3) || 12,795 || 5–3
|- style="background:#fbb;"
| 9 || April 12 || Cubs || 3–7 || Bere (1–1) || Williams (1–1) || — || 24,002 || 5–4
|- style="background:#cfc;"
| 10 || April 13 || Cubs || 3–2 || Fogg (2–0) || Clement (0–2) || Williams (5) || 17,971 || 6–4
|- style="background:#fbb;"
| 11 || April 14 || Cubs || 1–5 (8) || Lieber (2–0) || Villone (1–2) || Borowski (1) || 16,045 || 6–5
|- style="background:#cfc;"
| 12 || April 15 || @ Brewers || 6–1 || Wells (2–1) || Rusch (1–1) || — || 14,090 || 7–5
|- style="background:#cfc;"
| 13 || April 16 || @ Brewers || 5–1 || Anderson (2–1) || Neugebauer (0–2) || — || 15,012 || 8–5
|- style="background:#cfc;"
| 14 || April 17 || @ Brewers || 3–2 || Williams (2–1) || Buddie (0–1) || Williams (6) || 17,879 || 9–5
|- style="background:#cfc;"
| 15 || April 19 || Phillies || 7–4 || Lowe (1–0) || Padilla (2–2) || Williams (7) || 23,321 || 10–5
|- style="background:#cfc;"
| 16 || April 20 || Phillies || 6–5 || Villone (2–2) || Adams (0–2) || Williams (8) || 18,032 || 11–5
|- style="background:#cfc;"
| 17 || April 21 || Phillies || 9–3 || Wells (3–1) || Duckworth (1–1) || — || 18,749 || 12–5
|- style="background:#fbb;"
| 18 || April 23 || Dodgers || 6–9 || Ishii (4–0) || Anderson (2–2) || Gagne (8) || 13,235 || 12–6
|- style="background:#fbb;"
| 19 || April 24 || Dodgers || 1–5 || Daal (3–0) || Williams (2–2) || — || 14,057 || 12–7
|- style="background:#cfc;"
| 20 || April 25 || Dodgers || 3–2 || Fogg (3–0) || Nomo (2–3) || Williams (9) || 16,264 || 13–7
|- style="background:#fbb;"
| 21 || April 26 || Padres || 1–10 || Tomko (2–1) || Villone (2–3) || — || 20,575 || 13–8
|- style="background:#bbb;"
| — || April 27 ||colspan=7| Postponed
|- style="background:#cfc;"
| 22 || April 28 || Padres || 3–2 || Sauerbeck (1–0) || Embree (2–1) || Williams (10) || — || 14–8
|- style="background:#fbb;"
| 23 || April 28 || Padres || 2–7 || Tollberg (1–3) || Anderson (2–3) || — || 19,621 || 14–9
|- style="background:#fbb;"
| 24 || April 30 || @ Rockies || 0–10 || Hampton (1–3) || Williams (2–3) || — || 30,759 || 14–10
|-

|- style="background:#fbb;"
| 25 || May 1 || @ Rockies || 0–6 || Neagle (3–1) || Fogg (3–1) || — || 29,529 || 14–11
|- style="background:#fbb;"
| 26 || May 2 || @ Rockies || 2–7 || Thomson (4–2) || Villone (2–4) || — || 30,134 || 14–12
|- style="background:#cfc;"
| 27 || May 3 || @ Padres || 6–4 || Wells (4–1) || Howard (0–1) || Williams (11) || 20,312 || 15–12
|- style="background:#fbb;"
| 28 || May 4 || @ Padres || 0–3 || Jarvis (2–3) || Anderson (2–4) || Hoffman (10) || 36,972 || 15–13
|- style="background:#fbb;"
| 29 || May 5 || @ Padres || 5–6 || Lawrence (4–1) || Lowe (1–1) || Hoffman (11) || 27,399 || 15–14
|- style="background:#cfc;"
| 30 || May 6 || @ Diamondbacks || 3–2 || Fogg (4–1) || Johnson (6–1) || Williams (12) || 29,171 || 16–14
|- style="background:#fbb;"
| 31 || May 7 || @ Diamondbacks || 6–7 || Myers (2–1) || Beimel (0–1) || Kim (9) || 32,204 || 16–15
|- style="background:#fbb;"
| 32 || May 8 || @ Diamondbacks || 3–4 || Schilling (7–1) || Wells (4–2) || Kim (10) || 31,343 || 16–16
|- style="background:#cfc;"
| 33 || May 10 || Astros || 5–1 || Anderson (3–4) || Hernandez (3–1) || — || 19,197 || 17–16
|- style="background:#cfc;"
| 34 || May 11 || Astros || 4–2 || Fogg (5–1) || Oswalt (4–2) || Williams (13) || 35,834 || 18–16
|- style="background:#fbb;"
| 35 || May 12 || Astros || 1–5 || Reynolds (3–3) || Williams (2–4) || — || 20,202 || 18–17
|- style="background:#fbb;"
| 36 || May 13 || Diamondbacks || 0–11 || Schilling (8–1) || Benson (0–1) || — || 14,500 || 18–18
|- style="background:#cfc;"
| 37 || May 14 || Diamondbacks || 2–1 || Wells (5–2) || Anderson (0–3) || Williams (14) || 16,373 || 19–18
|- style="background:#fbb;"
| 38 || May 15 || Diamondbacks || 2–6 || Helling (4–4) || Anderson (3–5) || — || 18,780 || 19–19
|- style="background:#fbb;"
| 39 || May 16 || @ Astros || 1–3 || Oswalt (5–2) || Boehringer (0–1) || Wagner (6) || 26,277 || 19–20
|- style="background:#fbb;"
| 40 || May 17 || @ Astros || 4–7 || Stone (2–1) || Villone (2–5) || Dotel (1) || 28,861 || 19–21
|- style="background:#fbb;"
| 41 || May 18 || @ Astros || 1–2 || Dotel (2–1) || Lowe (1–2) || — || 34,921 || 19–22
|- style="background:#cfc;"
| 42 || May 19 || @ Astros || 5–3 || Wells (6–2) || Mlicki (3–5) || Williams (15) || 34,259 || 20–22
|- style="background:#cfc;"
| 43 || May 21 || @ Cubs || 12–1 || Anderson (4–5) || Bere (1–7) || — || — || 21–22
|- style="background:#fbb;"
| 44 || May 21 || @ Cubs || 3–4 || Cruz (1–7) || Fogg (5–2) || Alfonseca (6) || 37,175 || 21–23
|- style="background:#fbb;"
| 45 || May 22 || @ Cubs || 4–7 || Prior (1–0) || Williams (2–5) || Alfonseca (7) || 40,138 || 21–24
|- style="background:#fbb;"
| 46 || May 23 || @ Cubs || 6–11 || Clement (2–3) || Benson (0–2) || — || 37,578 || 21–25
|- style="background:#cfc;"
| 47 || May 24 || Cardinals || 5–2 || Wells (7–2) || Stephenson (1–3) || — || 25,203 || 22–25
|- style="background:#fbb;"
| 48 || May 25 || Cardinals || 3–6 || Williams (2–0) || Anderson (4–6) || Isringhausen (13) || 26,201 || 22–26
|- style="background:#fbb;"
| 49 || May 26 || Cardinals || 3–7 || Simontacchi (3–0) || Fogg (5–3) || — || 31,989 || 22–27
|- style="background:#cfc;"
| 50 || May 27 || Cubs || 3–2 (10) || Williams (1–0) || Alfonseca (0–1) || — || 16,215 || 23–27
|- style="background:#fbb;"
| 51 || May 28 || Cubs || 0–3 || Clement (3–3) || Benson (0–3) || — || 15,060 || 23–28
|- style="background:#cfc;"
| 52 || May 29 || Cubs || 5–0 || Wells (8–2) || Lieber (3–4) || — || 17,116 || 24–28
|- style="background:#fbb;"
| 53 || May 30 || Cubs || 8–9 || Wood (6–3) || Anderson (4–7) || Alfonseca (8) || 21,208 || 24–29
|- style="background:#cfc;"
| 54 || May 31 || @ Cardinals || 3–1 || Fogg (6–3) || Williams (2–1) || Williams (16) || 38,148 || 25–29
|-

|- style="background:#fbb;"
| 55 || June 1 || @ Cardinals || 4–9 || Kile (3–3) || Arroyo (0–1) || — || 43,295 || 25–30
|- style="background:#cfc;"
| 56 || June 2 || @ Cardinals || 5–2 || Lowe (2–2) || Morris (7–4) || Williams (17) || 37,243 || 26–30
|- style="background:#fbb;"
| 57 || June 3 || @ Expos || 5–7 || Ohka (5–3) || Wells (8–3) || Stewart (5) || 4,821 || 26–31
|- style="background:#cfc;"
| 58 || June 4 || @ Expos || 5–2 || Anderson (5–7) || Pavano (3–7) || Williams (18) || 4,619 || 27–31
|- style="background:#fbb;"
| 59 || June 5 || @ Expos || 1–3 || Vazquez (4–2) || Fogg (6–4) || — || 4,890 || 27–32
|- style="background:#cfc;"
| 60 || June 7 || Brewers || 6–1 || Beimel (1–1) || Sheets (3–6) || — || 27,001 || 28–32
|- style="background:#cfc;"
| 61 || June 8 || Brewers || 9–8 (11) || Boehringer (1–1) || King (1–2) || — || 38,244 || 29–32
|- style="background:#cfc;"
| 62 || June 9 || Brewers || 5–4 || Sauerbeck (2–0) || Wright (1–3) || Williams (19) || 24,897 || 30–32
|- style="background:#fbb;"
| 63 || June 10 || @ Angels || 3–4 || Washburn (6–2) || Anderson (5–8) || Percival (14) || 16,861 || 30–33
|- style="background:#cfc;"
| 64 || June 11 || @ Angels || 7–3 || Fogg (7–4) || Appier (5–5) || — || 17,755 || 31–33
|- style="background:#fbb;"
| 65 || June 12 || @ Angels || 5–8 || Weber (3–2) || Boehringer (1–2) || Percival (15) || 17,096 || 31–34
|- style="background:#fbb;"
| 66 || June 14 || @ Reds || 3–4 (11) || Williamson (2–0) || Williams (1–1) || — || 30,820 || 31–35
|- style="background:#fbb;"
| 67 || June 15 || @ Reds || 3–4 || Sullivan (4–2) || Lincoln (0–1) || Graves (21) || 31,419 || 31–36
|- style="background:#cfc;"
| 68 || June 16 || @ Reds || 5–1 || Anderson (6–8) || Haynes (7–6) || — || 29,532 || 32–36
|- style="background:#fbb;"
| 69 || June 18 || Athletics || 2–4 || Mulder (7–4) || Fogg (7–5) || Koch (16) || 21,943 || 32–37
|- style="background:#fbb;"
| 70 || June 19 || Athletics || 2–3 (10) || Bradford (3–1) || Williams (1–2) || Koch (17) || 30,562 || 32–38
|- style="background:#fbb;"
| 71 || June 20 || Athletics || 3–5 || Hudson (5–6) || Benson (0–4) || Koch (18) || 22,464 || 32–39
|- style="background:#fbb;"
| 72 || June 21 || Rangers || 0–2 || Rogers (8–4) || Wells (8–4) || Cordero (3) || 24,475 || 32–40
|- style="background:#fbb;"
| 73 || June 22 || Rangers || 2–3 || Bell (3–2) || Lincoln (0–2) || Irabu (13) || 35,302 || 32–41
|- style="background:#fbb;"
| 74 || June 23 || Rangers || 4–10 || Park (3–3) || Fogg (7–6) || — || 26,930 || 32–42
|- style="background:#cfc;"
| 75 || June 25 || Expos || 4–1 || Benson (1–4) || Ohka (7–4) || Williams (20) || 17,543 || 33–42
|- style="background:#cfc;"
| 76 || June 26 || Expos || 7–4 || Wells (9–4) || Vazquez (5–4) || Williams (21) || 36,966 || 34–42
|- style="background:#fbb;"
| 77 || June 27 || Expos || 2–7 (7) || Brower (3–0) || Villone (2–6) || — || 21,312 || 34–43
|- style="background:#cfc;"
| 78 || June 28 || @ Tigers || 3–1 || Fogg (8–6) || Redman (3–8) || Williams (22) || 28,582 || 35–43
|- style="background:#fbb;"
| 79 || June 29 || @ Tigers || 1–2 || Weaver (6–8) || Beimel (1–2) || Acevedo (12) || 24,449 || 35–44
|- style="background:#cfc;"
| 80 || June 30 || @ Tigers || 6–2 || Benson (2–4) || Maroth (1–2) || Williams (23) || 25,966 || 36–44
|-

|- style="background:#fbb;"
| 81 || July 1 || Brewers || 0–2 || Wright (2–6) || Wells (9–5) || — || 14,634 || 36–45
|- style="background:#fbb;"
| 82 || July 2 || Brewers || 6–12 || Quevedo (4–6) || Anderson (6–9) || — || 15,142 || 36–46
|- style="background:#cfc;"
| 83 || July 3 || Brewers || 3–1 || Fogg (9–6) || Sheets (4–10) || Williams (24) || 32,309 || 37–46
|- style="background:#fbb;"
| 84 || July 4 || Astros || 6–8 || Borbon (3–3) || Beimel (1–3) || — || 25,962 || 37–47
|- style="background:#cfc;"
| 85 || July 5 || Astros || 4–3 || Fetters (1–0) || Borbon (3–4) || Williams (25) || 24,556 || 38–47
|- style="background:#fbb;"
| 86 || July 6 || Astros || 2–10 || Cruz (1–4) || Wells (9–6) || — || 26,578 || 38–48
|- style="background:#fbb;"
| 87 || July 7 || Astros || 1–6 || Miller (4–3) || Anderson (6–10) || — || 23,348 || 38–49
|- style="background:#cfc;"
| 88 || July 11 || @ Brewers || 3–2 (10) || Boehringer (2–2) || DeJean (0–4) || Williams (26) || 21,021 || 39–49
|- style="background:#cfc;"
| 89 || July 12 || @ Brewers || 9–2 || Lowe (3–2) || Rusch (5–8) || — || 26,362 || 40–49
|- style="background:#cfc;"
| 90 || July 13 || @ Brewers || 5–3 || Wells (10–6) || Wright (2–8) || Williams (27) || 28,214 || 41–49
|- style="background:#fbb;"
| 91 || July 14 || @ Brewers || 3–5 || Quevedo (5–6) || Beimel (1–4) || DeJean (16) || 21,976 || 41–50
|- style="background:#cfc;"
| 92 || July 15 || @ Astros || 5–4 || Lowe (4–2) || Wagner (2–2) || Williams (28) || 29,204 || 42–50
|- style="background:#cfc;"
| 93 || July 16 || @ Astros || 7–3 || Fogg (10–6) || Oswalt (10–6) || Boehringer (1) || 27,042 || 43–50
|- style="background:#cfc;"
| 94 || July 17 || Reds || 6–3 || Anderson (7–10) || Dempster (5–10) || Williams (29) || 32,864 || 44–50
|- style="background:#fbb;"
| 95 || July 18 || Reds || 5–7 || Sullivan (6–3) || Boehringer (2–3) || Graves (28) || 21,625 || 44–51
|- style="background:#cfc;"
| 96 || July 19 || Cardinals || 12–9 || Sauerbeck (3–0) || Veres (3–6) || — || 23,812 || 45–51
|- style="background:#cfc;"
| 97 || July 20 || Cardinals || 15–6 || Benson (3–4) || Smith (3–1) || — || 35,101 || 46–51
|- style="background:#fbb;"
| 98 || July 21 || Cardinals || 4–8 || Finley (5–11) || Fogg (10–7) || Kline (3) || 27,999 || 46–52
|- style="background:#cfc;"
| 99 || July 22 || @ Reds || 6–5 || Anderson (8–10) || Dempster (5–11) || Williams (30) || 18,398 || 47–52
|- style="background:#fbb;"
| 100 || July 23 || @ Reds || 2–7 || Haynes (11–6) || Wells (10–7) || — || 19,884 || 47–53
|- style="background:#fbb;"
| 101 || July 24 || @ Reds || 5–10 || Moehler (2–1) || Beimel (1–5) || — || 24,910 || 47–54
|- style="background:#fbb;"
| 102 || July 25 || @ Astros || 0–8 || Saarloos (2–2) || Benson (3–5) || — || 26,027 || 47–55
|- style="background:#fbb;"
| 103 || July 26 || @ Astros || 3–4 || Wagner (3–2) || Sauerbeck (3–1) || — || 32,115 || 47–56
|- style="background:#fbb;"
| 104 || July 27 || @ Astros || 0–3 || Oswalt (11–6) || Anderson (8–11) || Wagner (20) || 38,896 || 47–57
|- style="background:#fbb;"
| 105 || July 28 || @ Astros || 0–4 || Miller (8–3) || Wells (10–8) || — || 35,144 || 47–58
|- style="background:#cfc;"
| 106 || July 30 || Rockies || 4–1 || Benson (4–5) || Neagle (4–7) || Williams (31) || 23,749 || 48–58
|- style="background:#cfc;"
| 107 || July 31 || Rockies || 7–6 || Boehringer (3–3) || White (2–6) || Williams (32) || 18,106 || 49–58
|-

|- style="background:#fbb;"
| 108 || August 1 || Rockies || 0–3 || Jennings (11–5) || Meadows (0–1) || Jimenez (27) || 19,075 || 49–59
|- style="background:#cfc;"
| 109 || August 2 || Giants || 6–5 || Boehringer (4–3) || Nen (4–1) || — || 28,203 || 50–59
|- style="background:#fbb;"
| 110 || August 3 || Giants || 6–11 || Schmidt (7–5) || Wells (10–9) || — || 38,275 || 50–60
|- style="background:#fbb;"
| 111 || August 4 || Giants || 5–10 || Rueter (10–6) || Benson (4–6) || — || 31,398 || 50–61
|- style="background:#cfc;"
| 112 || August 6 || @ Dodgers || 3–1 || Fogg (11–7) || Perez (10–8) || Williams (33) || 31,254 || 51–61
|- style="background:#fbb;"
| 113 || August 7 || @ Dodgers || 0–4 || Ashby (8–9) || Meadows (0–2) || Gagne (37) || 31,588 || 51–62
|- style="background:#fbb;"
| 114 || August 8 || @ Dodgers || 5–10 || Beirne (1–0) || Anderson (8–12) || — || 31,776 || 51–63
|- style="background:#cfc;"
| 115 || August 9 || @ Giants || 4–3 || Wells (11–9) || Schmidt (7–6) || Williams (34) || 41,897 || 52–63
|- style="background:#fbb;"
| 116 || August 10 || @ Giants || 3–8 || Aybar (1–0) || Lincoln (0–3) || — || 41,146 || 52–64
|- style="background:#fbb;"
| 117 || August 11 || @ Giants || 4–5 (11) || Nen (6–1) || Williams (1–3) || — || 41,479 || 52–65
|- style="background:#fbb;"
| 118 || August 12 || Cardinals || 6–10 || Simontacchi (8–4) || Meadows (0–3) || — || 15,700 || 52–66
|- style="background:#fbb;"
| 119 || August 13 || Cardinals || 5–9 || Morris (14–7) || Anderson (8–13) || Isringhausen (27) || 17,609 || 52–67
|- style="background:#fbb;"
| 120 || August 14 || Cardinals || 3–7 || Benes (2–3) || Wells (11–10) || — || 18,791 || 52–68
|- style="background:#fbb;"
| 121 || August 15 || Cardinals || 5–11 || Kline (1–1) || Williams (1–4) || — || 20,503 || 52–69
|- style="background:#fbb;"
| 122 || August 16 || Brewers || 3–10 || Sheets (7–14) || Fogg (11–8) || — || 35,343 || 52–70
|- style="background:#cfc;"
| 123 || August 17 || Brewers || 5–0 || Meadows (1–3) || Cabrera (5–9) || — || 25,277 || 53–70
|- style="background:#cfc;"
| 124 || August 18 || Brewers || 3–2 || Arroyo (1–1) || Rusch (6–13) || Williams (35) || 20,170 || 54–70
|- style="background:#fbb;"
| 125 || August 19 || @ Cardinals || 2–7 || Benes (3–3) || Wells (11–11) || — || 31,626 || 54–71
|- style="background:#cfc;"
| 126 || August 20 || @ Cardinals || 8–0 || Benson (5–6) || Hackman (3–4) || — || 34,997 || 55–71
|- style="background:#fbb;"
| 127 || August 21 || @ Cardinals || 1–4 || Finley (8–14) || Fogg (11–9) || Isringhausen (28) || 26,806 || 55–72
|- style="background:#fbb;"
| 128 || August 22 || @ Cardinals || 4–5 || Molina (1–0) || Williams (1–5) || — || 26,606 || 55–73
|- style="background:#cfc;"
| 129 || August 23 || @ Brewers || 6–3 || Lincoln (1–3) || Durocher (1–1) || Williams (36) || 30,957 || 56–73
|- style="background:#cfc;"
| 130 || August 24 || @ Brewers || 17–10 || Wells (12–11) || Cabrera (5–10) || — || 22,568 || 57–73
|- style="background:#cfc;"
| 131 || August 25 || @ Brewers || 3–2 || Benson (6–6) || Wright (5–13) || Williams (37) || 19,443 || 58–73
|- style="background:#fbb;"
| 132 || August 27 || Braves || 4–5 || Millwood (14–6) || Fogg (11–10) || Smoltz (46) || 20,542 || 58–74
|- style="background:#cfc;"
| 133 || August 28 || Braves || 1–0 (10) || Williams (2–5) || Remlinger (7–2) || — || 20,136 || 59–74
|- style="background:#cfc;"
| 134 || August 29 || Braves || 4–1 || Arroyo (2–1) || Glavine (16–8) || Williams (38) || 17,312 || 60–74
|- style="background:#fbb;"
| 135 || August 30 || @ Marlins || 3–4 || Tavarez (10–10) || Wells (12–12) || Looper (8) || 4,962 || 60–75
|- style="background:#fbb;"
| 136 || August 31 || @ Marlins || 2–3 || Nunez (6–5) || Sauerbeck (3–2) || Looper (9) || 10,188 || 60–76
|-

|- style="background:#fbb;"
| 137 || September 1 || @ Marlins || 4–8 || Neal (3–0) || Fogg (11–11) || — || 5,588 || 60–77
|- style="background:#fbb;"
| 138 || September 2 || @ Braves || 1–5 || Maddux (12–5) || Meadows (1–4) || — || 30,803 || 60–78
|- style="background:#cfc;"
| 139 || September 3 || @ Braves || 3–0 || Torres (1–0) || Glavine (16–9) || Williams (39) || 18,931 || 61–78
|- style="background:#fbb;"
| 140 || September 4 || @ Braves || 0–6 || Moss (10–5) || Wells (12–13) || — || 19,525 || 61–79
|- style="background:#cfc;"
| 141 || September 6 || Marlins || 11–0 || Benson (7–6) || Tejera (8–7) || — || 33,525 || 62–79
|- style="background:#cfc;"
| 142 || September 7 || Marlins || 4–1 || Fogg (12–11) || Robertson (0–1) || Williams (40) || 18,848 || 63–79
|- style="background:#fbb;"
| 143 || September 8 || Marlins || 1–11 || Pavano (4–10) || Meadows (1–5) || — || 15,211 || 63–80
|- style="background:#fbb;"
| 144 || September 9 || @ Reds || 8–9 || Dempster (8–13) || Torres (1–1) || Williamson (1) || 13,434 || 63–81
|- style="background:#fbb;"
| 145 || September 10 || @ Reds || 0–3 || Reitsma (6–10) || Wells (12–14) || Williamson (2) || 13,153 || 63–82
|- style="background:#cfc;"
| 146 || September 11 || @ Reds || 4–1 || Villone (3–6) || Dessens (7–8) || Williams (41) || 14,514 || 64–82
|- style="background:#cfc;"
| 147 || September 13 || @ Phillies || 5–3 || Beimel (2–5) || Timlin (4–6) || Williams (42) || 13,718 || 65–82
|- style="background:#fbb;"
| 148 || September 14 || @ Phillies || 1–4 || Junge (1–0) || Meadows (1–6) || Mesa (40) || 16,621 || 65–83
|- style="background:#fbb;"
| 149 || September 15 || @ Phillies || 0–1 (10) || Mesa (4–6) || Sauerbeck (3–3) || — || 23,054 || 65–84
|- style="background:#fbb;"
| 150 || September 16 || Reds || 3–4 || Silva (1–0) || Lincoln (1–4) || Williamson (5) || 10,752 || 65–85
|- style="background:#cfc;"
| 151 || September 17 || Reds || 11–3 || Benson (8–6) || Reitsma (6–12) || — || 10,991 || 66–85
|- style="background:#cfc;"
| 152 || September 18 || Reds || 3–2 || Lincoln (2–4) || Riedling (2–3) || Williams (43) || 11,684 || 67–85
|- style="background:#fbb;"
| 153 || September 19 || Reds || 4–5 || Hamilton (4–9) || Williams (2–6) || Williamson (6) || 11,338 || 67–86
|- style="background:#cfc;"
| 154 || September 20 || Cubs || 5–4 || Sauerbeck (4–3) || Alfonseca (2–5) || — || 22,299 || 68–86
|- style="background:#fbb;"
| 155 || September 21 || Cubs || 2–4 || Farnsworth (4–6) || Sauerbeck (4–4) || Cruz (1) || 33,653 || 68–87
|- style="background:#cfc;"
| 156 || September 22 || Cubs || 5–4 || Benson (9–6) || Benes (2–2) || Williams (44) || 25,026 || 69–87
|- style="background:#cfc;"
| 157 || September 24 || Mets || 6–3 || Sauerbeck (5–4) || Guthrie (5–3) || Williams (45) || 13,249 || 70–87
|- style="background:#cfc;"
| 158 || September 25 || Mets || 4–3 || Villone (4–6) || Roberts (3–1) || Williams (46) || 11,641 || 71–87
|- style="background:#cfc;"
| 159 || September 27 || @ Cubs || 13–3 || Torres (2–1) || Mahomes (1–1) || — || 27,637 || 72–87
|- style="background:#fbb;"
| 160 || September 28 || @ Cubs || 4–5 || Cruz (3–11) || Boehringer (4–4) || — || 38,617 || 72–88
|- style="background:#fbb;"
| 161 || September 29 || @ Cubs || 3–7 || Wood (12–11) || Fogg (12–12) || — || 37,541 || 72–89
|-

|-
| Legend:       = Win       = Loss       = PostponementBold = Pirates team member

Record vs. opponents

Detailed records

Roster

Opening Day lineup

Awards and honors

2002 Major League Baseball All-Star Game
Mike Williams, P, reserve

Statistics
Hitting
Note: G = Games played; AB = At bats; H = Hits; Avg. = Batting average; HR = Home runs; RBI = Runs batted in

Pitching
Note: G = Games pitched; IP = Innings pitched; W = Wins; L = Losses; ERA = Earned run average; SO = Strikeouts

Draft picks

Note
Age at time of draft.

Farm system

LEAGUE CHAMPIONS: Lynchburg, Hickory

References

 2002 Pittsburgh Pirates at Baseball Reference
 2002 Pittsburgh Pirates  at Baseball Almanac

Pittsburgh Pirates seasons
Pittsburgh Pirates Season, 2002
Pittsburgh Pirates Season, 2002
Pitts